A general election was held in the U.S. state of Delaware on November 6, 2018. Half of Delaware's executive officers were up for election as well as a United States Senate seat and Delaware's at-large seat in the United States House of Representatives. Primary elections were held on September 6, 2018.

In the general election, Democrats took over all statewide offices and defeated two of the highest ranking Republicans in the Delaware General Assembly. Those races were all won by Democratic women, putting a record number of women in statewide elected offices in Delaware. The Democratic Party became the first party to hold all nine statewide offices in Delaware since the Republican Party in 1970.

Federal

Senate

House of Representatives

State

Constitutional officers

Attorney General

Incumbent Democratic Attorney General Matthew Denn did not run for reelection to a second term in office. The Republican Party originally nominated former chief Sussex County prosecutor Peggy Marshall Thomas, however Thomas later withdrew and the party nominated former New Castle County attorney Bernard Pepukayi.

Former New Castle County chief administrative officer Kathy Jennings won the Democratic nomination, defeating three opponents, and went on to defeat Pepukayi in the general election.

Treasurer

Republican nominee and incumbent State Treasurer Ken Simpler, Democratic nominee Colleen Davis, and Green nominee David Chandler (who was also the nominee in 2014), were all unopposed in their respective primaries. Davis won the general election, denying Simpler a second term in office.

Auditor of Accounts
Incumbent Republican State Auditor Tom Wagner did not run for reelection to an eighth term. Republican nominee James Spadola was unopposed in his respective primary and won the nomination.

Kathy McGuiness won the Democratic nomination, defeating two opponents, and went on to win the general election against Spadola.

General Assembly

Senate

The state of Delaware will have various State Senate elections in the general election.

District 2

District 3

District 4

District 6

District 10

District 11

District 16

District 17

District 18

District 21

House of Representatives

Certain notable State House elections are below.

District 6

District 7
Incumbent State Representative Bryon Short did not run for reelection. Perennial candidate Rose Izzo previously ran her campaign for the Republican Party's nomination, but later switched to run for the Democratic nomination. Eric Braunstein won the Republican primary unopposed.

District 10

District 12

District 36
After Kerri Evelyn Harris's loss in the U.S. Senate election, many progressive Delaware Democrats shifted focus to support Don Allan in District 36. He was endorsed by Our Revolution, Delaware United, Kerri Evelyn Harris, and U.S. Representative Lisa Blunt Rochester.

References

 
Delaware